The eastern water bat or Sakhalin bat (Myotis petax) is a species of mouse-eared bat. It was for a long time considered to be a subspecies of Myotis daubentonii.

Distribution
The Eastern water bat is a forest bat found in Russia (south and eastern Siberia, Transbaikalia, Primorye and Sakhalin), northern China, Mongolia, Korea, and Japan (Hokkaido).

References

External links

Mouse-eared bats
Taxa named by Ned Hollister
Bats of Asia
Mammals described in 1912